is the title of two different Mari Hamada compilation albums released by Victor Entertainment.

Golden Best: Mari Hamada ~Victor Years~

 was released on September 15, 2010 as a two-CD compilation, covering Hamada's songs from 1983 to 1990.

Track listing

Golden Best: Mari Hamada (2015)

 was released on June 24, 2015 as a single-disc compilation
in Super High Material CD (SHM-CD) format.

Track listing

References

External links 
  (2010)
  (2015)
 
 
 

2010 compilation albums
2015 compilation albums
Japanese-language compilation albums
Mari Hamada compilation albums
Victor Entertainment compilation albums